Gold Trail Union School District is a small Kindergarten-8th grade school district located in El Dorado County, California.

History
GTUSD was formed from seven one-room school houses in 1956. Gold Trail School was constructed in 1957 to accommodate all K-8th students. The graduating class of 1960 consisted of nine students. In 1991, Sutter's Mill Elementary School was opened, and Gold Trail School was designated only to 4th-8th grade students while Sutter's Mill handled the Pre-K through 3rd grade students. As of 2013, the graduating class consisted of seventy students.

References

External links
 

School districts in El Dorado County, California
1956 establishments in California
School districts established in 1956